Jugurtha Hamroun (born 27 January 1989) is an Algerian professional footballer who plays as an attacking midfielder or winger for Qatari club Al-Markhiya.

After starting out at Guingamp in France, he went on to compete professionally in Bulgaria, Turkey, Romania and Qatar.

Hamroun represented Algeria at under-23 level, making his debut in November 2011.

Early life
Hamroun was born in the town of Bouzeguene in the Tizi Ouzou Province. At age 5, he moved with his family to France, where they settled in Neuilly-sur-Marne in the eastern suburbs of Paris.

Club career

Guingamp
At age 12, Hamroun joined the youth ranks of French club En Avant de Guingamp. On 8 April 2008, he signed his first professional contract, for a period of three years, and on 29 August of that year he made his Ligue 2 debut, coming as a substitute for Cédric Liabeuf in the 83rd minute of a 1–1 home draw against CS Sedan Ardennes.

During his three-year spell at the Stade du Roudourou, Hamroun alternated between the first team and the reserves, going on to appear in 26 competitive games for the former, including twice in the 2009–10 UEFA Europa League.

Chernomorets Burgas
On 26 July 2011, Hamroun signed a three-year deal with Bulgarian team PSFC Chernomorets Burgas, joining on a free transfer. He scored in his A PFG debut, helping to a 2–0 home win over PFC Lokomotiv Plovdiv on 20 August.

Kardemir Karabükspor
On 18 January 2012, however, Hamroun moved clubs and countries again, being sold to Kardemir Karabükspor in the Turkish Süper Lig for a reported fee of €600,000. He played his first match three days later, starting and featuring 70 minutes in the 2–1 home success over Trabzonspor.

In his first full season, Hamroun contributed with 20 scoreless appearances as the side narrowly avoided relegation after ranking 15th.

Oțelul Galați
In January 2015, after being a free agent since the summer, Hamroun signed a six-month contract with Romania's FC Oțelul Galați, who were in the midst of a financial crisis. The second of his Liga I goals came on 19 April in a 2–1 win at eventual champions FC Steaua București, but his team was not able to eventually stave off relegation.

FCSB
After Oțelul's relegation into Liga II, Hamroun refused to extend his contract and, as it was due to expire, fellow league side FC Petrolul Ploiești showed interest in signing the player. On 29 June 2015, he was announced as player of Giresunspor on their official website, but the deal eventually fell through due to the club being in debt and not allowed to make any transfers; in July, he joined FCSB  on a three-year deal, making his debut on the 14th against AS Trenčín in the first leg of the second qualifying round for the UEFA Champions League and scoring the second goal of the 2–0 away win.

Samsunspor
In January 2021, Hamroun became part of the Samsunspor team.

International career
On 22 December 2009, Hamroun was called up to the Algerian under-23 national team by head coach Abdelhak Bencheikha, for a week-long training camp in Algiers. In October 2011, after scoring four goals in eight games in the Bulgarian League, he was recalled by new manager Azzedine Aït Djoudi after an almost two-year absence.

On 15 November 2011, Hamroun made his debut for the under-23s, as a second-half substitute in a friendly against South Africa. The following day, he was selected for the squad due to appear at the Africa U-23 Cup of Nations in Morocco.

Career statistics

Club

Honours
Guingamp
Coupe de France: 2008–09

Steaua București
Cupa Ligii: 2015–16

Al Sadd
Qatar Crown Prince Cup: 2017
Emir of Qatar Cup: 2017
Qatari Super Cup: 2017

References

External links

1989 births
Living people
People from Tizi Ouzou Province
Kabyle people
Algerian emigrants to France
Algerian footballers
Association football midfielders
Association football wingers
Ligue 2 players
Championnat National players
En Avant Guingamp players
First Professional Football League (Bulgaria) players
PFC Chernomorets Burgas players
Süper Lig players
Kardemir Karabükspor footballers
Liga I players
ASC Oțelul Galați players
FC Steaua București players
Qatar Stars League players
Qatari Second Division players
Al Sadd SC players
Al Kharaitiyat SC players
Qatar SC players
Al-Markhiya SC players
Algeria youth international footballers
Algeria under-23 international footballers
2011 CAF U-23 Championship players
Algerian expatriate footballers
Expatriate footballers in France
Expatriate footballers in Bulgaria
Expatriate footballers in Turkey
Expatriate footballers in Romania
Expatriate footballers in Qatar
Algerian expatriate sportspeople in France
Algerian expatriate sportspeople in Romania
Algerian expatriate sportspeople in Bulgaria
Algerian expatriate sportspeople in Qatar
Algerian expatriate sportspeople in Turkey